Baetis pluto is a species of small minnow mayfly in the family Baetidae. It is found in North America.

References

Further reading

External links

 

Mayflies
Articles created by Qbugbot
Insects described in 1925